The 2017 Gulf 12 Hours was the seventh edition of the Gulf 12 Hours held at Yas Marina Circuit on 14–16 December 2017. The race was contested with LMP3 prototypes, GT3-spec cars, GTX cars and GT4-spec cars.

Entry list
The official entry list consisted of 26 cars, including 7 in LMP3 prototype, 10 in GT3 and 8 in GTX.

Results

Results After 6 hours
Class winners denoted in bold.

Final Results
Class winners denoted in bold.

References

External links 
 

Endurance motor racing
Gulf
Gulf
Gulf 12 Hours